Chilecomadia is a genus of moths in the family Cossidae.

Species
 Chilecomadia moorei Silva Figuero, 1915 – Chilean moth
 Chilecomadia valdiviana Philippi, 1860
 Chilecomadia zeuzerina Bryk, 1945

References

 , 1990: A phylogenetic study on Cossidae (Lepidoptera: Ditrysia) based on external adult morphology. Zoologische Verhandelingen 263: 1-295. Full article: .

External links
Natural History Museum Lepidoptera generic names catalog

Chilecomadiinae
Cossidae genera